The Tom Moffatt Waikiki Shell is a venue for outdoor concerts and other large gatherings in the Waikiki area of Honolulu, Hawaii. Built in 1956, the Tom Moffatt Waikiki Shell seats 2,400 persons and the lawn area has capacity for an additional 6,000 persons.  It is under the management of the Neal S. Blaisdell Center.  It has been compared to the Hollywood Bowl.

The venue is located in Kapiolani Park in Waikiki, between the dense high-rises of the neighborhood and the dormant tuff cone volcano, Diamond Head.

In 2018 the venue was renamed "The Tom Moffatt Waikiki Shell," in memory of Hawaii's first rock DJ, later a concert promoter. Moffatt died in 2016.

References

External links
 Waikiki Shell Web Site

See also
 List of contemporary amphitheatres

Amphitheaters in the United States
Waikiki
Buildings and structures in Honolulu
Tourist attractions in Honolulu
Music venues in Hawaii
Buildings and structures completed in 1956
1956 establishments in Hawaii